Noelani Malia Day (born 24 April 2003) is a Tongan swimmer. She competed in the women's 50 metre freestyle at the 2019 World Aquatics Championships and she finished in 67th place. In 2021, she competed in the women's 50 metre freestyle event at the 2020 Summer Olympics held in Tokyo, Japan.

References

External links
 

2003 births
Living people
Tongan female swimmers
Place of birth missing (living people)
Tongan female freestyle swimmers
Swimmers at the 2020 Summer Olympics
Olympic swimmers of Tonga
21st-century Tongan women